

About 
Ten Lifestyle Group (also known as Ten Group or Ten Concierge) is a global travel and lifestyle concierge (also known as lifestyle management) company founded in 1998 by Alex Cheatle and Andrew Long. The company's headquarters is based in London with 22 global offices in major cities including New York, Dubai, Hong Kong, Singapore and Tokyo. Alex Cheatle is the company's Chief Executive Officer.

History 
Ten was founded in London in 1998. The business began as a company providing lifestyle concierge services to 20 members in London, growing as the number of requests increased.

In 2001, Ten won its first corporate contract to provide concierge services on behalf of a major banking group. Today, Ten partners with global financial institutions and other premium brands to attract and retain wealthy and mass affluent customers. Millions of members have access to Ten's services across lifestyle, travel, dining, entertainment and premium retail categories on behalf of over 50 clients including Coutts, HSBC, Royal Bank of Canada, OCBC, Isetan, China Merchants Bank, and ICBC.

In 2017, Ten was admitted to the London Stock Exchange's secondary market (AIM: TENG) at a value of 134.0 pence per share. During the roadshows, Ten raised £18 million valuing the Company at £104.8 million. Institutional investors currently include Soros Fund Management, Baillie Gifford, and Lombard Odier, as well as other blue chip institutions.

Ten currently has more than 2 million registered private and corporate individuals around the world, who are serviced by a workforce of over 1,000 in all key jurisdictions, 24/7, 365 days a year.

Operations

Ten Lifestyle Group provides 24/7 concierge services to its private and corporate members. Clients are able to book travel tickets, secure reservations at restaurants, access specialist event planning and personal shopping, and book various entertainment including music, theatre and sporting events worldwide.

Ten's operations are underpinned by an increasingly sophisticated personalisation platform consisting of industry-first, proprietary technology, thousands of supplier relationships and 25 years of proprietary expertise.  

Digital Platform

In 2014, Ten developed its digital platform. Members are able to search for and book tables, sports, theatre and music tickets, and plan their next holiday or city break through the platform.

References 

Travel and holiday companies of the United Kingdom